The Getchell Mine is an underground gold mine in the Potosi Mining District of Humboldt County, Nevada, on the east flank of the Osgood Mountains, 35 miles northeast of Winnemucca. Prospectors Edward Knight and Emmet Chase discovered gold in 1933 and located the first claims in 1934. With the financial backing of Noble Getchell and George Wingfield, the Getchell Mine, Inc. was organized in 1936 and the mine was brought into production in 1938.

The mining operation currently consists of two underground mines, Getchell and Turquoise Ridge, operated as the Turquoise Ridge Joint Venture. Barrick Gold is operator and 75% owner with Newmont Mining owning the remaining 25%. The mining method currently used is underhand cut-and-fill. The refractory gold ore is treated by pressure oxidation technology at the Twin Creeks Sage autoclave and gold recovered using conventional carbon-in-leach technology.

The gold deposit is a sediment-hosted disseminated Carlin–type deposit, with sub-micron sized gold distributed in pyrite and marcasite.

The mineral getchellite,  a rare sulfide of arsenic and antimony, AsSbS3, was discovered at and named after the Getchell mine .

References

Further reading

External links
Getchell Mine at mindat.org 
Turquoise Ridge JV, Twin Creeks Operation, mine data updated to 2018. Accessed 11/9/2019. 
Photo tour of Turquoise Ridge, Mar 21, 2018. Accessed 11/9/2019 
Turquoise Ridge Mine at Western Mining History

Gold mines in Nevada
Buildings and structures in Humboldt County, Nevada
Underground mines in the United States
Barrick Gold
1930s establishments in Nevada